Simbiatu "Simbi" Abisola Abiola Ajikawo (born 23 February 1994), better known by her stage name Little Simz, is a British rapper, singer and actress. She rose to prominence with the independent release of her first three albums; A Curious Tale of Trials + Persons (2015), Stillness in Wonderland (2016) and Grey Area (2019), the last of which was shortlisted for the Mercury Prize and won the awards for Best Album at both the Ivor Novello Awards and the NME Awards. 

Her fourth album, Sometimes I Might Be Introvert (2021) received widespread critical acclaim, with several publications deeming it the best album of 2021. It went on to win the 2022 Mercury Prize. It also earned her the 2022 Brit Award for Best New Artist and the Libera Award for Best Hip-Hop/Rap Record. Her fifth album, No Thank You (2022), was released to critical acclaim.

Outside of music, Simz has starred in the Netflix revival drama series Top Boy.

Early life 
Ajikawo was born in Islington, London, to Nigerian parents. She was raised on a council estate with two older sisters. Her mother was also a foster carer during her childhood. She is ethnically Yoruba.

She studied at Highbury Fields School in London and went on to attend St Mary's Youth Club in Upper Street, Islington, which pop stars Leona Lewis and Alexandra Burke also attended. Ajikawo has credited  Mary's Youth Club influence on her career, describing it as "the place where it all began for me … a second home".

Ajikawo later studied at Westminster Kingsway College and The University of West London where she pursued her music career from there.

Artistry 
She describes her music as rap and experimental. Whilst she is closely affiliated with the grime genre, she has also pulled inspiration from other genres including reggae, blues, synth-rock and jazzy R&B.

Simz grew up listening to rap artists Busta Rhymes, Nas and Biggie Smalls, which influenced her to pursue a rap career. Lauryn Hill has often been cited as one of her biggest influences. Simz stated "I think The Miseducation of Lauryn Hill was really my education. Lauryn Hill was one of the first artists that really made me feel the power of music." She also drew inspiration jazz musicians Nina Simone, John Coltrane and Billie Holiday for her album Sometimes I Might Be Introvert.

Career

Acting
Simz' acting career began with the role of Vicky in the BBC children's series Spirit Warriors, originally broadcast in 2010, and as Meleka in the E4 television series, Youngers. She was narrator for the television series, Afrofuturism, and played Shelley in Netflix's revival and third series of Top Boy which premiered in autumn 2019. She appeared as herself in the Sony/Marvel film Venom: Let There Be Carnage, singing her song "Venom" in a nightclub.

Music 

Simz has performed at Rising Tide, iluvlive, Industry Takeover (Urban Development) Hackney Empire, Somerset House and the House of Lords. She also performed at the BBC 1Xtra Prom 2015 at the Royal Albert Hall, alongside a full orchestra led by Jules Buckley. Simz can be heard on the Leave to Remain film soundtrack, performing the song "Leave It As That". In early 2013, she appeared on BBC Radio 1Xtra to discuss her performance at the Hackney Weekend. Simz then went on to do a Maida Vale session for Huw Stephens. She also has received praise from Kendrick Lamar.

On 16 December 2016 she released her second studio album Stillness in Wonderland. It was inspired by Alice's Adventures in Wonderland and supported by a comic book, art exhibition and festival. In 2017, she performed as the opening act for Gorillaz during their Humanz Tour, and was the vocalist for the song "Garage Palace", featured on the Super Deluxe edition of their album Humanz.

Simz releases her music on her own Age 101 Music record label with an exclusive distribution licensing arrangement with AWAL Recordings. On 6 September 2018, Simz and her label AGE 101 signed a worldwide deal with AWAL Recordings, after AWAL had distributed her debut album "A Curious Tale of Trials + Persons" in 2015. This deal was renewed on 18 June 2020.

Her 2019 studio album Grey Area was released to critical success and was nominated for the Mercury Prize, and IMPALA's European Independent Album of the Year Award (2019).

On 3 September 2021, she released her fourth studio album, Sometimes I Might Be Introvert debuting at number 4 on the UK album charts and winning BBC 6's Album of the Year.

On 6 December 2022, Simz announced her upcoming fifth studio album, No Thank You, which was released on 12 December. 

Simz performed her song "Heart On Fire" with Joan Armatrading during the 76th British Academy Film Awards ceremony, held on 19 February 2023.

Personal life 
Ajikawo lives in London. She is a childhood friend of actor Fady Elsayed and actress Letitia Wright. Ajikawo and Wright have remained good friends and Ajikawo photographed Wright for the artwork for her single, "Selfish" in 2019. Whilst Ajikawo believes in God, she does not currently follow any religion.

In 2018 her friend, model Harry Uzoka, was murdered, inspiring her to write her song "Wounds".

Discography

Studio albums

Mixtapes

Extended plays

Singles

As featured artist

Other charted songs

Guest appearances

Notes

Tours
 AGE101 DROP THE WORLD (2015)
 Welcome To Wonderland (2017–2018)
 Grey Area Tour (2019)
 Sometimes I Might Be Introvert (2021)

Filmography

Awards and nominations

References

External links
 
 
 

1994 births
Living people
Black British women rappers
Brit Award winners
English women rappers
English people of Nigerian descent
Grime music artists
People from Islington (district)
Rappers from London
English people of Yoruba descent
Yoruba musicians